KMMO-FM 102.9 FM is a radio station licensed to Marshall, Missouri.  The station broadcasts a country music format and is owned by Missouri Valley Broadcasting, Inc.

References

External links
KMMO's website

MMO
Country radio stations in the United States